NBCNews.com, formerly known as msnbc.com, is a news website owned and operated by NBCUniversal as the online arm of NBC News. Along with original and wire reporting, it features content from NBC shows such as Today, NBC Nightly News, Meet The Press, and Dateline NBC, the MSNBC cable channel, and partners such as The New York Times.

The site was founded in 1996 as a 50-50 venture between NBCUniversal and Microsoft at the same time as the two companies formed a separate joint venture for the cable news network MSNBC. Although they shared the same name, msnbc.com and MSNBC maintained separate corporate structures and news operations, with msnbc.com headquartered on the West Coast on the Microsoft campus in Redmond, Washington, and MSNBC in the NBC headquarters in New York. Microsoft divested its stake in the MSNBC channel in 2005, and divested its stake in msnbc.com in July 2012.

Gregory Gittrich, the former editor-in-chief of NBC Local Integrated Media and, before that, the assistant managing editor of the New York Daily News, was named vice president and executive editor of msnbc.com in October 2012, and began to reduce the news staff, pulling back from doing original journalism online.
He reported to Vivian Schiller, former chief executive officer of National Public Radio. By 2014, with the msnbc.com staff greatly reduced, both Gittrich and Schiller had moved on to Vocativ.

History

The site was established as msnbc.com in 1996 at the same time as the MSNBC cable news channel; both of which were initially joint ventures with the software company Microsoftthe MSNBC channel was based in New Jersey, and msnbc.com was based at Microsoft's headquarters in Redmond, Washington. While NBC bought Microsoft's stake in MSNBC in 2005, msnbc.com remained a partnership between the two companies, and the two outlets remained relatively separate entities.  Msnbc.com also acquired several other news websites, including community-driven news site Newsvine in October 2007, and the hyperlocal news site EveryBlock in August 2009.

Despite sharing its name with the MSNBC channel, the content of the two outlets had become increasingly distinct. While msnbc.com remained a traditional, nonpartisan news service, the MSNBC channel had diverged towards a liberal slant in its content. NBC's staff were concerned about the differences, as they felt that some readers may have believed that the msnbc.com site was also a liberal-oriented news outlet like the channel. Plans were drafted to re-brand its conventional news site under a different name, such as NBCNews.com, and to re-purpose msnbc.com as a website for the MSNBC channel itself.

On July 14, 2012, NBC officially announced that Microsoft had sold back its half share of msnbc.com for $300 million. On the same day, NBC also announced the immediate renaming of msnbc.com to NBCNews.com, and the planned launch of a new website for MSNBC in 2013 that would focus on its programming and personalities. Despite the separation of MSNBC and Microsoft, the site will still be a part of and receive traffic from Microsoft's MSN.com portal.

2014 redesign 
On February 5, 2014, a major redesign of NBCNews.com was introduced; NBC News president Deborah Turness explained that the new design is intended to "[tear] down the walls that traditionally have divided TV and digital", by emphasizing multimedia content, original features, and more original reporting from NBC News personalities. The new site uses a responsive design with an infinite scrolling grid of stories, along with new original features such as "Know It All", "The Debunker", and "Show Me".

Reception to the new design was mixed, with criticism directed towards its image-oriented layout rather than a clearer, headline-oriented design; however, the redesign did result in a significant increase in traffic for the site, especially on mobile devices—which saw a 186% increase in traffic. Executive editor Gregory Gittrich admitted that the site's staff members "weren’t surprised by the initial feedback because the change was so significant, but that’s why the data and metrics were obviously important." Changes were made to the design to address these shortcomings, including the addition of dedicated areas with a listing of recent headlines, followed by an overhaul of the home page to use a more traditional layout, but still incorporating large images for major headlines.

Ranking
As of May 2009, NBCNews.com had ranked first in U.S. unique users among global news sites for 12 months in a row. In May it had 37.2 million unique users in the U.S. for the month, according to Nielsen/NetRatings. In second place was Yahoo! News with 35.8 million, then CNN with 34.4. At last count, NBCNews.com also served the most online video of any new site, with more than 125 million video streams in May 2008.

September 2014 rankings show NBCNews.com at number 7 among most popular news websites at 63 million unique visitors a month. Less than half of Yahoo! News (175M) and Google News (150M).

Content

NBCNews.com covers national and international news of general interest, using original and wire service reporting, as well as videos from the network's television division, and partners including The New York Times.

A major focus is online content for the NBC News family of programming, including Today, NBC Nightly News, Dateline, Meet the Press, and programming on MSNBC television. This content includes behind the scenes blogs such as "The Daily Nightly", a narrative of the broadcast day and a window into the editorial process at NBC Nightly News; "First Read," analysis of the day's political news from the NBC News Political Unit; “allDAY”, allowing viewers to see behind the scenes of Today; and Zeitgeist, a satirical video blog hosted by MSNBC's Willie Geist. Original content  from international correspondents and producers is posted on World News on NBCNews.com.

Video is distributed via the MSN Video service. Additionally, the website provides stock quotes through MSN Money, weather forecasts through Weather.com, RSS feeds, podcasts, and netcasts of the network's broadcasts. Following the introduction of CNN's iReport concept, NBCNews.com also introduced a citizen journalism section titled “First Person”. The section allows viewers to upload video, photos and stories in response to suggested topics.

In 2017, NBCNews.com introduced new verticals such as "Mach", which covers science and technology, and "Better", with health and life tips, along with a digital opinion section called "THINK."

Recognition
As the former msnbc.com, the site won several journalism and online publishing awards, including the Society of Professional Journalists award for online investigative reporting, Online News Association's Online Journalism Award for General Excellence and Best Use of Multiple Media; National Press Club's Best Journalism Site; for its coverage of Hurricane Katrina, “Rising from Ruin”, and the Best in Business Award from the Society of American Business Editors and Writers and Best Use of Multiple Media.

Alumni

NBCNews.com has an array of former employees who went on to other leading positions in new media and journalism. Merrill Brown, the site's first editor-in-chief, was a senior vice president of RealNetworks before starting his own consultancy, MMB Media. Jonathan Dube, a former producer/reporter, left in 2005 to run the website of Canadian broadcaster CBC and is vice president of ABC News in charge of ABCNews.com. Mark Pawlosky, former MSNBC executive producer, went on to be editor in chief of MSN Money/CNBC.com. He is now editorial director for American City Business Journals. Jeannette Walls, who wrote the site's "Scoop" entertainment column for eight years, wrote the book The Glass Castle. Joan Connell, former Opinions editor, runs the website of The Nation magazine. Frank Barbieri, a former interactive producer and business development specialist, now runs the mobile media company Transpera. Dean Wright, former editor-in-chief, ran Reuters Digital from 2005 to 2008 and is Reuters' senior vice president for consumer services. Michael Silberman, longtime managing editor/East Coast, is general manager of digital media at New York magazine.

References

External links

NBC News
MSN
MSNBC
Former General Electric subsidiaries
Former Microsoft subsidiaries
American news websites
Internet properties established in 1996
1996 establishments in the United States